The Government of Assam is the subnational government of  Assam, a state of India. It consists of the Governor appointed by the President of India as the head of the state, currently Gulab Chand Kataria. The head of government is the Chief Minister, currently Dr. Himanta Biswa Sarma, who is the leader of the group that commands a majority in the unicameral Assam Legislative Assembly. The Assam Assembly is elected by universal adult suffrage for a period of five years. The Chief Minister is assisted by a Council of Ministers that he nominates, the size of which is restricted.

In 2021, the National Democratic Alliance won a majority of seats in the legislature, with 75 seats, followed by Congress with 29 seats and AIUDF with 16.

Cabinet Ministers 
Ministers sworn on 10 May 2021:

Leaders

References

External links